Neoterebra shyana is a species of sea snail, a marine gastropod mollusk in the family Terebridae, the auger snails.

Distribution
This species occurs in the Pacific Ocean in shallow waters (less than 200m) off the Galapagos Islands.

References
CDF Galapagos Species : Terebra shyana
 Fedosov, A. E.; Malcolm, G.; Terryn, Y.; Gorson, J.; Modica, M. V.; Holford, M.; Puillandre, N. (2020). Phylogenetic classification of the family Terebridae (Neogastropoda: Conoidea). Journal of Molluscan Studies

Terebridae
Gastropods described in 1970